Pakistan has, over its 60-year history, issued over 600 issues and 1,100 stamps and souvenir sheets.

 1947 to 1966
 1967 to 1976
 1977 to 1986
 1987 to 1996
 1997 to 2006
 2007 to 2016
 2017 to present

1997
Poets of Pakistan, 86th birth anniversary of Faiz Ahmad Faiz – 13 February 1997
Special Summit of Organisation of Islamic Cooperation, Islamabad – 23 March 1997
660th Jubilee of Amir Temur – 8 April 1997
Great Poets of Pakistan & Iran, Allama Muhammad Iqbal and Jalal-ud-Din Moulana Rumi – 21 April 1997
Fruits of Pakistan “Apple” – 8 May 1997
Birth of Abdullah Malik - 4 June 1997
World Population Day – 11 July 1997
40 Years of IAEA–PACE Cooperation
Golden Jubilee of Pakistan – 14 August 1997
Pioneers of Pakistan – 1997
75th Anniversary of Lahore College for Women
Medicinal Plants of Pakistan, lashsan (garlic) – 22 October 1997
Wildlife Series – 29 October 1997
Protect our Earth Save the Ozone Layer – 15 November 1997
Pakistan Motorway Project Lahore-Islamabad Section – 25 November 1997
International Day of Disabled – 3 December 1997
150th Anniversary of Karachi Grammar School – 30 December 1997

1998
 1998 – 1 Death Anniversary of Mirza Ghalib – 15 February 1998
 1998 – 2 Defence Service of Pakistan Celebrations – 23 March 1998
 1998 – 3 Death Centenary of Sir Syed Ahmed Khan – 27 March 1998
 1998 – 4 27th National Games, Peshawar – 22 April 1998
 1998 – 5 Medicinal Plants of Pakistan “Dhatura” – 27 April 1998
 1998 – 6 Silver Jubilee of the Senate of Pakistan – 6 August 1998
 1998 – 7 Centenary of Government College, Faisalabad – 14 August 1998
 1998 – 8 17th Definitive Series – 14 August 1998
 1998 – 9 Ophthalmologic Congress – 11 September 1998
 1998 – 10 50th Death Anniversary of Quaid-e-Azam Mohammad Ali Jinnah  – 11 September 1998
 1998 – 11 Birth Centenary of Patrus Bukhari – 1 October 1998
 1998 – 12 Fifty Years of Philately in Pakistan – 4 October 1998
 1998 – 13 World Food Day, Women Feed the World – 16 October 1998
 1998 – 14 Scientist of Pakistan Series “Prof Dr. Abdul Salam” – 21 November 1998
 1998 – 15 Pakistan 2010 Program – 27 November 1998
 1998 – 16 50th Anniversary of the Universal Declaration of Human Rights – 10 December 1998
 1998 – 17 50 Years of UNCIEF in Pakistan – 11 December 1998
 1998 – 18 International Year of the Ocean – 15 December 1998
 1998 – 19 Qaumi Parcham March – 16 December 1998

1999

Thirty-five stamps and two souvenir sheets: 
International Conference on 100 Years of Kingdom of Saudi Arabia - 2 stamps Rs.2, Rs.15 and a souvenir sheet Rs.20, with perforated stamp of Rs.15–27 January 1999
Prof. Dr.Salimuzzaman Siddiqui - 1 stamp Rs.5–14 April 1999
Yaum-e-Takbeer, 28 May Pakistan Quest for Self-Reliance - 1 stamp Rs.5–28 May 1999
Data Durbar Complex, Lahore - 1 stamp Rs.7–31 May 1999
Archeological Heritage of Pakistan - Fasting Buddha - 2 stamps Rs.7 each, and a souvenir sheet Rs. 25–21 July 1999
50th Anniversary of Geneva Convention - 1 stamp Rs.5–12 August 1999
Pioneers of Freedom Ch.Muhammad Ali, Sir Adamjee Dawood, Moulana Abdul Hameed Badayuni - 3 stamps Rs. 2 each - 14 August 1999
2nd Death Anniversary of Ustad Nusrat Fateh Ali Khan - 1 stamp Rs. 2–16 August 1999
Islamic Development Bank - 1 stamp Rs.5–18 September 1999
Golden Jubilee Celebration of the Founding of People's Republic of China - 2 stamps Rs.2, Rs.15–21 September 1999
9th Asian Sailing Championship - 5 stamps Rs.2 each - 28 September 1999
10th Asian Optimist Sailing Championship - 1 stamp Rs.2–7 October 1999
125th Anniversary of the Universal Postal Union - 1 stamp Rs.10–7 October 1999
First Anniversary of Martyrdom of Hakim Muhammad Said - 1 stamp Rs.5–17 October 1999
Golden Jubilee of National Bank of Pakistan - 1 stamp Rs.5–8 November 1999
100 Years of Shell in Pakistan - 1 stamp Rs.4–15 November 1999
Convention on the Rights of the Child Decade Celebration - 1 stamp Rs.2–20 November 1999
25 Years of Allama Iqbal Open University, Islamabad - 3 stamps Rs.2, Rs.3, Rs.5–20 November 1999
Birth Centenary of Shabbir Hassan Khan Josh Malihabadi, Poets of Pakistan Series - 1 stamp Rs.5–5 December 1999
Prof. Dr. Afzal Qadri, Scientists of Pakistan Series - 1 stamp Rs.5–6 December 1999
Ghulam Farid Aleg, Men of Letters Series - 1 stamp Rs.5–10 December 1999
Ispogel Seeds/Plantation, Medical Plants of Pakistan series - 1 stamp Rs.5–20 December 1999
Eid ul Fitter (This stamp was issued on the request of Akhtar ul Islam Siddiqui) - 2 stamps Rs.2, Rs.15–24 December 1999

2000
Twenty-four stamps issued on sixteen occasions:
 
 1.25th Anniversary SOS Children's Villages of Pakistan 1 Stamps Rs.2,12 March 2000
 2.Centenary of International Cycling Union,1 Stamps Rs.2,14 April 2000
 3.Convention of Human Rights & Human Dignity,1 Stamps Rs.2,21 April 2000
 4.Centenary of Edward College, Peshawar,1 Stamps Rs.2,24 April 2000
 5.Birth Anniversary of Muhammad Ali Habib,1 Stamps Rs.2,21 April 2000
 6.30 Years of institute of Cost & Management Accounts of Pakistan,     2 Stamps Rs.2, Rs.15, 23 June 2000
 7.Ahmad E.H.Jaffer,1 Stamps Rs.10, 9 August 2000
 8.Sarfroshane Tehreeke Pakistan, 4 Stamps Rs.5 Each, 9 August 2000
 9.Nishan-e-Haider, Major Tufail Muhammad Shaheed & Captain Muhammad Sarwar Shaheed    2 Stamps Rs.5 Each, 6 September 2000
10.XXVII Olympic Games Sydney 2000, 4 Stamps Rs.4 Each, 20 September 2000
11.125th Year of Excellence 1875-2000 National College of Arts, Lahore,     1 Stamps Rs.5, 28 October 2000
12.Creating the future Conference, 1 Stamps Rs.5, 4 November 2000
13. International Defence Exhibition- Ideas -2000, 1 Stamps Rs.7, 14 November 2000
14.Liquorice (Mulathi), 1 Stamps Rs.2, 28 November 2000
15.A world without Polio,1 Stamps Rs.2, 13 December 2000
16.50th Anniversary of U.N. High Commissioner for Refugees ( UNHCR)     1 Stamps Rs.2, 14 December 2000

2001
 [ 33 Stamps were issued in 2001 on 20 different occasions ]
   Edited by: Akhtar ul Islam Siddiqui  February 2014
 1. Abul Asar Hafeez Jalandri   
     [1 stamp Rs.2 14 January 2001]
 2. Habib Bank A.G.Zurich   
     [1 stamp Rs.5 20 March 2001]
 3. The Chashma Nuclear Power Plant   
     [1 stamp Rs.2 29 March 2001]
 4. 9th SAF Games
     [2 stamp Rs.4 Each,  9 April 2001]
 5. 50th Anniversary of Pak China Friendship  
     [3 stamp Rs.4 Each,  12 May 2001]
 6. 2001 As Year Of Quaid-e-Azam Muhammad Ali Jinnah 
     [1 stamp Rs.4,  14 August 2001]
 7. Major Shabbir Sharief ( Shaheed) & Major Muhammad Akram ( Shaheed )
     [2 stamp Rs.4 Each,  6 September 2001]
 8. Festival 2001
     [1 stamp Rs.4,  22 September 2001]
 9. Khawaja Farid (Poets of Pakistan Series 
     [1 stamp Rs.5,  25 September 2001]
10. United Nations Year of Dialogue Among Civilization
     [1 stamp Rs.4,  9 October 2001]*13. 
11. Dr. Imtiaz Ali Taj ( Men of Letters Series)
     [1 stamp Rs.5,  13 October 2001]
12. Tenth Anniversary of Independence of Turkmenistan
     [1 stamp Rs.5,  17 October 2001]
13. Medical Plant of Pakistan (Series) Depicting "peppermint"
     [1 stamp Rs.4,  12 November 2001]
14. 125 Years of Convent of Jesus & Mary, Lahore
     [1 stamp Rs.4,  15 November 2001]
15. Prof.Dr.Ishtiaq Hussain Qureshi( Men of Letters Series)
     [1 stamp Rs.4,  20 November 2001]
16. Wild Life Series, Depicting Birds
     [4 stamp Rs.4,  20 November 2001]
17. 30th Anniversary of Pakistan-UAE Diplomatic Relations
     [2 stamp Rs.5 & Rs. 30,  2 December 2001]
18. Golden Jubilee, Nishter Medical College (1951-2001)
     [2 stamp Rs.5 & Rs. 30,  2 December 2001]
19. 2001 As Year Of Quaid-e-Azam Muhammad Ali Jinnah 
     [5 stamp Rs.4 Each,  25 December 2001]
20. Golden Jubilee of Pakistan Ordinance Factories Wah
     [2 stamp Rs.4,  28 December 2001]

2002
21 Stamps were issued on 12 occasions
 1. Samandar Khan Samandar (Poets of Pakistan)
    [1 Stamp Rs.5 17 January 2002]
 2. Medical Plants of Pakistan - Depicting "HYSSOP"
    [1 Stamp Rs.5 15 February 2002] 
 3. 50th Anniversary of Pakistan Japan Relations
    [1 Stamp Rs.5 28 April 2002] 
 4. 10th Anniversary of Pakistan Kyrgyzstan Relations
    [1 Stamp Rs.5 27 May 2002]
 5. Fruits of Pakistan- Mango
    [4 Stamp Rs.4 Each, 18 June 2002]
 6. 55th Independence Day Celebrations
    [4 Stamp Rs.4 Each, 14 August 2002]    
 7. World Summit on Sustainable Development (WSSD) Johannesburg
    [2 Stamp Rs.4 Each, 26 August 2002]
 8. Muhammad Ali Rangoonwala
    [1 Stamp Rs.4, 31 August 2002] 
 9. Lance Naik Muhammad Mehfooz (Shaheed) & Sarwar Muhammad Hussain (Shaheed)
    [2 Stamp Rs.4 Each, 6 September 2002]
10. 2002 As Year of Allama Muhammad Iqbal 
    [2 Stamp Rs.4 Each, 9 November 2002]
11. Eid Mubarik - This stamp was issued on the suggestion of Akhtar ul Islam Siddiqui
    [1 Stamp Rs.4, 14 November 2002]
12. Shifa ul Mulk, Hakim Muhammad Hassan Qureshi
    [1 Stamp Rs.4, 20 December 2002]

2003

**In 2003 Pakistan Post Office issued 46 stamps on 22 different occasions

 1 .National Philatelic Exhibition - Pakistan 2003
    [1 Stamps Rs.4, 31 January 2003]
 2 .Golden Jubilee of Pakistan Academy of Science, Islamabad
    [1 Stamps Rs.4, 15 February 2003]
 3 .Centenary Celebrations of N.W.F.P
    [1 Stamps Rs.4, 23 March 2003]
 4 .Golden Jubilee of Pakistan Council of Scientific & Industrial Islamabad P.C.S.I.R.
    [1 Stamps Rs.4, 31 March 2003]
 5 .Prof. A.B.A. Haleem
    [1 Stamps Rs.2, 20 April 2003]
 6 .Creating Awareness Against Drug Abuse
    [1 Stamps Rs.2, 21 April 2003]
 7 .Sir Syed Memorial Society, Islamabad.
    [1 Stamps Rs.2, 30 April 2003]
 8 .Medicinal Plants of Pakistan (Rose)
    [1 Stamps Rs.2, 14 July 2003]
 9 .Year of Mohtarma Fatima Jinnah
    [1 Stamps Rs.4, 31 July 2003]
10 .The Silent Servers of Pakistan Post
    [2 Stamps Rs.2 Each, 3 August 2003]
11 .56th Independence Day (Tahreek-e-Pakistan ke Mujahid)
    [3 Stamps Rs.2 Each, 14 August 2003]
12 .United Nations Literacy Decade: Education for All
    (International Plan of Action) 
    Implementation of General Assembly Resolution 56/116 
    [1 Stamps Rs.1, 6 September 2003]
13 .Pilot Officer Rashid Minhas (Shaheed) Nishn-e-Haider
    [1 Stamps Rs.2, 7 September 2003]
14 .Pakistan Academy of Letters, Islamabad
    [1 Stamps Rs.2, 24 September 2003]
15 .25th Anniversary of Karakoram Highway
    [1 Stamps Rs.2, 1 October 2003]
16 .Golden Jubilee of First Ascent of Nanga Parbat
    [1 Stamps Rs.2, 6 October 2003]
17 .Golden Jubilee of P.A.F. Public School, Sargodha
    [1 Stamps Rs.4, 10 October 2003]
18 .US $10 Billion Exports Target 2002-2003
    [20 Stamps Rs.1 Each, 20 October 2003]
19 .The Eve of International Day for Disabled
    [1 Stamps Rs.2, 3 December 2003]
20 .World Summit on The Information Society
    [1 Stamps Rs.2, 10 December 2003]
21 .Brief History of Submarine Construction in Pakistan
    [2 Stamps Rs.1 & Rs.2, 12 December 2003]
22 .100th Anniversary of Powered Flight (1903-2003)
    [2 Stamps Rs.2 Each, 17 December 2003]

2004

** As per Siddiqui Catalogue In 2004 Pakistan Post Office issued 51 Stamps and two Miniature sheets on 20 different Occasions**

1  SAARC Summit, Islamabad    
    [1 Stamp Rs.4, 12 January 2004]
 2  Golden Jubilee of Sadiq Public School, Bahawalpur 
    [1 Stamp Rs.4, 28 January 2004] 
 3  9th SAF Games, Islamabad   
    [12 Stamps Rs.2 Each, 29 March 2004]
 4  Justice Pir Muhammad Karam Shah Al-Azhar (1918-1998)
    [1 Stamp Rs.2, 7 April 2004]
 5  Golden Jubilee of Cadet College Hasanabdal
    [1 Stamp Rs.4, 8 April 2004]  
 6  Central Library, Bahawalpur
    [1 Stamp Rs.2, 26 April 2004] – 26 April 2004
 7  Bhong Mosque, Rahim Yar Khan
    [1 Stamp Rs.4, 12 May 2004]  
 8  Centennial Celebrations of Federation International De Football Association FIFA
    [3 Stamp Rs.5 Each, 21 May 2004]  
 9  Our Cultural Assets (Silk Route)
    [2 Stamp Rs.4 Each, 7 June 2004]  
10  Golden Jubilee of Sui Southern Gas Company (SSGC)
    [1 Stamp Rs.4,  24 July 2004]
11  Golden Jubilee of first ascent of K2
    [1 Stamp Rs.5 And Miniature Sheet Rs.30, 31 July 2004]
12  XXVII  Athens Olympic Games, 2004
    [4 Stamp Rs.5 Each, 13 August 2004]
13  57th Independence Anniversary of Pakistan
    [4 Stamp Rs.5 Each, 14 August 2004]
14  Maulvi Abdul Haq  (Men of Letters)
    [1 Stamp Rs.4, 16 August 2004]
15  IV International Calligraphy & Calligraph Art Exhibition & Competition -Pakistan 2004
    [1 Stamp Rs.5, 1 October 2004]
16  Popular Aquarium Varieties of Tropical Fishes
    [5 Stamp Rs.2 Each, 9 October 2004]
17  50th Anniversary of Japan's Assistance For Economic Development
    & Co-operation for Eradication of Diseases
    [4 Stamp Rs.5 Each and a Miniature Sheet, 8 November 2004]
18  Declaration of the Year 2004 as the "Year of Child Right"
    [1 Stamp Rs.4, 20 November 2004]
19  30 Years of Allama Iqbal Open University, Islamabad
    [1 Stamp Rs.20, 6 December 2004]
20  Golden Jubilee of Khyber Medical College, Peshawar ( 1954-2004)
    [1 Stamp Rs.20, 20 December 2004]

2005
 In  2005 [Pakistan Post Office] issued 33 stamps & one Souvenir Sheet on 19 different Occasions.

 1. Allama Iqbal & Mihai Eminescu Dialogue Between Civilizations.
    [2 Stamps Rs.5 Each,  14 January 2005]  
 2. Professor Ahmed Ali  1910-1994
    [1 Stamp  Rs.5,  14 January 2005]  
 3. Saadat Hasan Manto 1912-1955 ( Men of Letter Series).
    [1 Stamp  Rs.5,  18 January 2005]
 4. Pakistan Air Force, Breaking the Barriers
    [4 Stamps Rs.5 Each,  23 March 2005]  
 5. Centenary Celebrations of Command & Staff College Quetta.
    [1 Stamp Rs.5,  2 April 2005] 
 6. 85th Anniversary of Turkish Grand National Assembly
    [2 Stamps Rs.10 Each,  23 April 2005] 
 7. IBA 50 Years of Excellence 1955-2005
    [2 Stamps Rs.3 Each,  30 April 2005]
 8. Islamia High School Quetta
    [1 Stamp  Rs.5,  25 May 2005]
 9. Akhtar Shirani
    [1 Stamps Rs.5, 30 June 2005]
10. 2nd Phase of the World Summit n the information Society
    [1 Stamps Rs.5, 15 July 2005]
11. Rehman Baba, Poets of Pakistan
    [1 Stamps Rs.5, 4 August 2005]
12. Lahore Marathon 2005
    [1 Stamps Rs.5, 10 September 2005]
13. Mushrooms
    [10 Stamps Rs.5 Each, 1 October 2005]
14. Help Earth Quake Victims
    [1 Souvenir Sheet with 8 stamps Rs.4 Each Rs.100/- Rs.5, 27 October 2005]
15. International Year of Sport & Physical Education
    [1 Stamps Rs.5, 5 November 2005]
16. To Commemorate two Decades of Saarc
    [1 Stamps Rs.5, 12 November 2005]
17. Khawaja Sarwar Hasan 1902-1973 (Men of Letter)
    [1 Stamps Rs.5, 18 November 2005]
18. SOS Children's Villages of Pakistan
    [1 Stamps Rs.5, 20 November 2005]
19. World Menteam Squesh Championship Islamabad
    [1 Stamps Rs.5, 8 December 2005]

2006

** As per Siddiqui Catalogue In 2006 Pakistan Post Office issued 35 Stamps on 13 different Occasions**
 1 .Golden Jubilee of Supreme Court of Pakistan ( 1956-2006)
    [2 Stamps Rs.4 & Rs. 15, 23 March 2006]
 2 .Quaid-i-Azam Muhammad Ali Jinnah's Visit to Armoured Corps Centre
    [2 Stamps Rs.5 Each, 14 April 2006]
 3 .Birth Centenary Begum Rana Liaqat Ali Khan
    [1 Stamp  Rs.5, 13 June 2006]
 4 .400th Anniversary of Sri Guru Arjun Dev Jee
    [1 Stamp  Rs.5, 16 June 2006]
 5 .Shandur Polo Festival, Chitral
    [1 Stamp  Rs.5, 1 July 2006]
 6 .Promotion of Tourism in Pakistan (Lake Series)
    [4 Stamp  Rs.5 Each, 20 July 2006]
 7 .Painters of Pakistan Series
    [10 Stamp  Rs.4 Each, 14 August 2006]
 8 .Centenary of Hamdard Services
    [1 Stamp  Rs.5, 25 August 2006]
 9 .First Anniversary of Earth Quake of 8 October 2005.
    [1 Stamp  Rs.5, 8 October 2006]
 10 .Medicinal Plants of Pakistan ( Chamomilla & Aloe Vera)
    [2 Stamp  Rs.5 Each, 30 October 2006]
 11 .International Anti-Corruption Day
    [1 Stamp  Rs.5, 9 December 2006]
 12 .10 Years of Baltit Fort Heritage Trust
    [1 Stamp  Rs.15, 20 December 2006]
 13 .Centenary Celebration of the Muslim League 1906-2006
    [8 Stamp  Rs.4 Each, 30 December 2006]

References
1. Siddiqui online Stamps Catalogue 2014 Edition Available at www.pakistanphilately.com

External links
 Official website of Pakistan Post

1997